The Lockheed T-33 Shooting Star (or T-Bird) is an American subsonic jet trainer. It was produced by Lockheed and made its first flight in 1948. The T-33 was developed from the Lockheed P-80/F-80 starting as TP-80C/TF-80C in development, then designated T-33A.  It was used by the U.S. Navy initially as TO-2, then TV-2, and after 1962, T-33B. The last operator of the T-33, the Bolivian Air Force, retired the type in July 2017, after 44 years of service.

Design and development

The T-33 was developed from the Lockheed P-80/F-80 by lengthening the fuselage by slightly more than 3 feet (1 m) and adding a second seat, instrumentation, and flight controls. It was initially designated as a variant of the P-80/F-80, the TP-80C/TF-80C.

Design work on the Lockheed P-80 began in 1943, with the first flight on 8 January 1944. Following on the Bell P-59, the P-80 became the first jet fighter to enter full squadron service in the United States Army Air Forces. As more advanced jets entered service, the F-80 took on another role—training jet pilots. The two-place T-33 jet was designed for training pilots already qualified to fly propeller-driven aircraft.

Originally designated the TF-80C, the T-33 made its first flight on 22 March 1948 with Lockheed test pilot Tony LeVier at the controls. Production at Lockheed ran from 1948 to 1959. The US Navy used the T-33 as a land-based trainer starting in 1949. It was designated the TV-2, but was redesignated the T-33B in 1962. The Navy operated some ex-USAF P-80Cs as the TO-1, changed to the TV-1 about a year later. A carrier-capable version of the P-80/T-33 family was subsequently developed by Lockheed, eventually leading to the late 1950s to 1970s T2V-1/T-1A SeaStar. The two TF-80C prototypes were modified as prototypes for an all-weather two-seater fighter variant, which became the F-94 Starfire. A total of 6,557 T-33s were produced: 5,691 of them by Lockheed, 210 by Kawasaki, and 656 by Canadair.

Operational history

U.S. Air Force and U.S. Navy
The two-place T-33 proved suitable as an advanced trainer, and it has been used for such tasks as drone director and target towing. The U.S. Air Force began phasing the T-33 out of front-line pilot training duties in the Air Training Command in the early 1960s, as the Cessna T-37 Tweet and Northrop T-38 Talon aircraft began replacing it for the Undergraduate Pilot Training (UPT) program. The T-33 was used to train cadets from the Air Force Academy at Peterson Field (now Peterson Air Force Base in Colorado Springs). The T-37 replaced the T-33 for Academy training in 1975. The final T-33 used in advanced training was replaced 8 February 1967 at Craig AFB, Alabama. Similar replacement also occurred in the U.S. Navy with the TV-1 (also renamed T-33 in 1962), as more advanced aircraft such as the North American T-2 Buckeye and Douglas TA-4 Skyhawk II came on line. USAF and USN versions of the T-33 soldiered on into the 1970s and 1980s with USAF and USN as utility aircraft and proficiency trainers, with some of the former USN aircraft being expended as full-scale aerial targets for air-to-air missile tests from naval aircraft and surface-to-air missile tests from naval vessels.  Several T-33s were assigned to USAF McDonnell F-101 Voodoo, Convair F-102 Delta Dagger, and Convair F-106 Delta Dart units, to include similarly equipped Air National Guard units, of the Aerospace Defense Command as proficiency trainers and practice "bogey" aircraft. Others later went to Tactical Air Command, and TAC gained Air National Guard F-106 and McDonnell-Douglas F-4 Phantom II units in a similar role until they were finally retired, with the last being an NT-33 variant retired in April 1997.

Military use by other nations
Some T-33s retained two machine guns for gunnery training, and in some countries, the T-33 was even used in combat: the Cuban Air Force used them during the Bay of Pigs Invasion, scoring several kills including sinking two transport ships. The RT-33A version, reconnaissance aircraft produced primarily for use by foreign countries, had a camera installed in the nose and additional equipment in the rear cockpit. T-33s continued to fly as currency trainers, drone towing, combat and tactical simulation training, "hack" aircraft, electronic countermeasures, and warfare training and test platforms right into the 1980s.

The T-33 has served with over 30 nations and continues to operate as a trainer in smaller air forces. Canadair built 656 T-33s on licence for service in the RCAF—Canadian Forces as the CT-133 Silver Star, while Kawasaki manufactured 210 in Japan. Other operators included Brazil, Turkey, and Thailand, which used the T-33 extensively.

In the 1980s, an attempt was made to modify and modernize the T-33 as the Boeing Skyfox, but a lack of orders led to the project's cancellation. About 70% of the T-33's airframe was retained in the Skyfox, but it was powered by two Garrett AiResearch TFE731-3A turbofan engines.

In the late 1990s, 18 T-33 Mk-III and T-33 SF-SC from the Bolivian Air Force went to Canada to be modernized at Kelowna Flightcraft.  New avionics were installed, and detailed inspection and renewal of the fuselage and wings were performed.  Most of the aircraft returned in early 2001 and remained operational until the type was officially retired on 31 July 2017.

On 21 June 1996, 1 T-33A-5-LO (trainer TR-602) from the Hellenic Air Force piloted by Squadron Leader Ioannis Kouratzoglou successfully intercepted a Turkish F-16C violating Athens FIR by engaging in low-altitude high-G maneuvers.

Civilian use
A limited number of T-33s have been owned privately, with two used by Boeing as chase aircraft. In 2010, one T-33 owned by Boeing was used as a chase aircraft during the maiden flight of the Boeing 787. The maiden flight of the Boeing 737 MAX-7 on 16 March 2018 also featured a T-33 chase plane. The maiden flight of the Boeing 777-9 on January 25, 2020 also featured a T-33 chase plane, taking off from KBFI and meeting the 777-9 at KPAE, it stopped at KMWH and it took off again to chase the 777-9 on its way back to KBFI, flying around Mount Rainier before their landing. On December 4, 2020, Boeing retired their T-33 Chase Planes after 66 years of service. Both T-33s operated by Boeing were replaced by a single T-38 Talon.  Actor and pilot Michael Dorn owned a T-33.

Variants
TP-80C
Original United States military designation for the Lockheed Model 580 two-seat trainer for the United States Army Air Forces.  Designation changed to TF-80C on 11 June 1948 following establishment of the United States Air Force as a separate military service in 1947, and then to T-33A on 5 May 1949; 20 built.
T-33A
Two-seat jet trainer aircraft for the United States Air Force and delivery to foreign air forces under the Military Assistance Program, 5871 including 699 diverted to the United States Navy as the TV-2.
AT-33A
Conversions of the T-33A for export as a close support variant fitted with underwing pylons and hard points for bombs and rockets.  Also used in the original fighter lead-in program at Cannon AFB, NM approximately 1972-1975. 
DT-33A
This designation was given to a number of T-33As converted into drone directors.
NT-33A
This designation was given to a number of T-33As converted into special test aircraft.
QT-33A
This designation was given to number of T-33As converted into aerial target drones for the United States Navy.
RT-33A
T-33A modified before delivery as a single-seat reconnaissance variant; 85 built, mainly for export under the Military Assistance Program.
T-33B
Re-designation of the United States Navy TV-2 in 1962.
DT-33B
Re-designation of the United States Navy TV-2D drone director in 1962.
DT-33C
Re-designation of the United States Navy TV-2KD target in 1962
TO-1/TV-1
U.S. Navy designation of P-80C, 50 transferred to USN in 1949 as jet trainers (not technically T-33 Shooting Star)
TO-2
United States Navy designation for 649 T-33As diverted from USAF production. Two-seat land-based jet training aircraft for the U.S. Navy. First 28 were delivered as TO-2s before the Navy changed the designation to TV-2. Surviving United States Navy and United States Marine Corps aircraft were re-designated T-33B on 18 September 1962.
TV-2 
Re-designation of the TO-2 after the first 28 were built.
TV-2D
TV-2s modified as drone directors, later re-designated DT-33B.
TV-2KD
TV-2s modified as radio-controlled targets, could be flown as a single-seater for ferry, later re-designated DT-33C.

Canada
Silver Star Mk 1
Canadian designation for the T-33A, 20 delivered.
Silver Star Mk 2
Canadian designation for a T-33A which became the prototype of the Silver Star Mk 3.
T-33AN/CT-133 Silver Star Mk 3
The T-33AN is a Rolls-Royce Nene-powered variant of the T-33A for the Royal Canadian Air Force; 656 built by Canadair with the company designation CL-30. The Canadian military designation was later changed from T-33AN to CT-133.

Other
L-245
One Lockheed-owned prototype with a more powerful engine. Was later developed into the T2V SeaStar.
Aérospatiale Pégase
A Canadair T-33AN was modified by Aérospatiale with an S17a 17% thickness wing section.
Boeing Skyfox A comprehensive upgrade and re-engine project, powered by 2 Garrett TFE-731 turbofans. The sole prototype remains parked, without engines, at Rogue Valley International (MFR) at Medford, Oregon.
Khodkar 

Iranian conversion of T-33A into drone. Iran unveils first home-made wide-body drone 'Khodkar'

Former operators

For operators of Canadian-built aircraft, refer to Canadair CT-133 Silver Star.

Bangladesh Air Force (1 × RT-33 operated from 1972. Leftover of Pakistan Air Force after Bangladesh Liberation War.)

Belgian Air Force (38 × T-33A, 1 × RT-33A operated from 1952)

Bolivian Air Force - Bolivia acquired 15 T-33AN from Canada in 1973–74, purchasing 5 more from Canada in 1977 and 18 T-33SFs from France in 1985. 18 were upgraded to T-33-2000 standard in 2000–2001. Retired in 2017.

Brazilian Air Force

Burmese Air Force – 15 x AT-33A for use as trainers and close air support.

Royal Canadian Air Force
Royal Canadian Navy
 VU-32 Utility Squadron
Canadian Forces
National Research Council

Chilean Air Force

Republic of China Air Force

Colombian Air Force

Cuban Air Force

Royal Danish Air Force

Dominican Air Force – AT-33A

Ethiopian Air Force

Ecuadorian Air Force – AT-33A

 Salvadoran Air Force

French Air Force – 163 x T-33A and RT-33A (also 61 Canadian-built T-33AN)

German Air Force  192 x T-33A

Hellenic Air Force – T-33A, RT-33A, and Canadian-built AT-33ANs

Guatemalan Air Force

Honduran Air Force – T-33A and RT-33A

Indonesian Air Force – T-33A

Imperial Iranian Air Force
Islamic Republic of Iran Air Force

Italian Air Force  operated 60 Lockheed T-33A and 14 Lockheed RT-33A from 1952 until 1982
 (all retired)
Japan Air Self Defense Force T-33A – assembled and later manufactured by Kawasaki Heavy Industries Aerospace Company from 1956.
 Tactical Fighter Training Group (1981–1992)
 3rd Tactical Fighter Squadron (1956–1992)
 6th Tactical Fighter Squadron (1959–1992)
 8th Tactical Fighter Squadron (1959–1992)
 201st Tactical Fighter Squadron (1963–1974, 1986–1994)
 202nd Tactical Fighter Squadron (1964–1992)
 203rd Tactical Fighter Squadron (1964–1992)
 204th Tactical Fighter Squadron (1964–1993)
 301st Tactical Fighter Squadron (1973–1993)
 302nd Tactical Fighter Squadron (1974–1994)
 303rd Tactical Fighter Squadron (1976–1994)
 304th Tactical Fighter Squadron (1977–1993)
 305th Tactical Fighter Squadron (1978–1993)
 306th Tactical Fighter Squadron (1981–1994)

Royal Libyan Air Force – two T-33As donated by the United States.

 Mexican Air Force – 50 units AT-33A

Royal Netherlands Air Force – 60 × T-33A, 3 × RT-33A

Nicaraguan Air Force FAN received delivery of four AT-33A aircraft from the US Government after the failed Bay of Pigs invasion in 1961. Retired from service in 1979.

Royal Norwegian Air Force

Pakistan Air Force – T-33A, RT-33A

Paraguayan Air Force operated six AT-33A donated by Taiwan in 1990. The belonged to the Grupo Aerotáctico (GAT) 2nd. Fighter Squadron called "Indios". They were withdrawn from use in 1998.

Peruvian Air Force

Philippine Air Force

Portuguese Air Force T-33A and one RT-33A (all retired)

Royal Saudi Air Force

Republic of Singapore Air Force: 12 x Former French Air Force T-33A delivered in 1980, followed by 8 more in 1982.

Republic of Korea Air Force: T-33A is First introduction Time: August, 1955. It also served with the ROKAF Black Eagles aerobatic team

Spanish Air Force – 60 × T-33A

Royal Thai Air Force

Turkish Air Force – T-33A and RT-33A

Boeing Commercial Airplanes (two Canadair CT-133 Silver Stars, N109X and N416X)
United States Air Force
United States Navy
United States Marine Corps

Uruguayan Air Force operated 13 AT-33A-1s from 1956 to 1997.

Yugoslav Air Force – Operated 125 Shooting Stars in four variants: 25 T-33A, 22 RT-33A, 70 TV-2, and 8 TT-33A

Aircraft on display

Numerous T-33s have been preserved as museum and commemorative displays.

Notable accidents and incidents
4 August 1955 First Lt. Elmer C. Bybee (of Walden CO) and Second Lt. Conrad J. Zubalik (of Greensburg PA), US Air Force, were flying a T-33 on a training sortie out of Perrin Air Force Base (Sherman TX) when a wing snapped off during a turn. The aircraft crashed near Grapevine Lake Dam north of the Dallas-Ft Worth Airport. Both pilot trainees perished in the crash.

4 June 1957 Maj. Teruhiko Kobayashi, a flying ace of the Imperial Japanese Air Force, was flying a T-33 on a training sortie from Hamamatsu when a technical problem occurred just shortly after takeoff. He ordered his companion in the jet with him to eject. After his companion did, he tried to take control of the aircraft and attempted to land it away from any populated areas, but crashed shortly after.

23 December 1957 1 US T-33 flown by Maj Howard J.Curran entered Albanian airspace, alleging that he had interference requiring him to fly in Albanian airspace. He was forced to land on Rinas Airport by 2 Albanian MiG-15 flown by Anastas Ngjela and Mahmut Hysa. Major Howard J.Curran was later released but his T-33 was placed in the Gjirokastra castle museum, where it is still today. 

24 March 1958 Lt Col. Jacob E. Manch, a member of the Doolittle Raiders during World War 2, was killed in a T-33 jet trainer accident outside of Las Vegas, NV.  He ordered the second crewmember to bail out and guided his powerless aircraft over a neighborhood, that included an elementary school, avoiding potential casualties on the ground.  When he finally ejected, his parachute did not have sufficient time to properly operate, and he died when he hit the ground.

20 May 1958 An Air National Guard Lockheed T-33A was involved in a mid-air collision with Capital Airlines Flight 300, a Vickers Viscount, over Brunswick, Maryland.

19 September 1968 A Chilean Air Force T-33A crewed by Sub-lieutenant Jorge Emberg and Second Lieutenant René Catalán crashed shortly after take off from El Bosque Air Base due to an engine failure. Emberg managed to eject safely but Catalán and six people on the ground died when the aircraft crashed on the Santa Erna neighborhood.

20 August 1971    On 20 August 1971, Pilot Officer Rashid Minhas was scheduled to fly a Lockheed T-33 jet trainer from PAF Base Masroor in Karachi.  Bir Sreshtho Matiur Rahman, an instructor pilot, saw Minhas about to take off and joined him via the instructor's seat. Rahman then attempted to hijack the T-33 in midair, intending to fly the plane to India, defect, and join the Bangladesh Liberation War and fight for his motherland. Minhas sent a message to control tower that he has been hijacked before being tackling down and knocked unconscious. Pakistan Air Force Scrambled F-86 Sabre jets  but they could not find Matiur. In the meantime Rashid came to consciousness and there was a struggle between the two pilots and the plane crashed in Pakistan, 40 kilometers from the Indian border, killing both pilots; the precise cause of the crash is unknown.

Specifications (T-33A)

See also

References

Bibliography
 Baugher, Joe. "Lockheed P-80/F-80." USAF Fighters. Retrieved: 11 June 2011.
 
 
 Davis, Larry. P-80 Shooting Star. T-33/F-94 in action. Carrollton, Texas: Squadron/Signal Publications, 1980. .
 Dorr, Robert F. "P-80 Shooting Star Variants". Wings of Fame Vol. 11. London: Aerospace Publishing Ltd., 1998. .
 Francillon, René J. Lockheed Aircraft since 1913. London: Putnam, 1982. .
 "Fuerza Aérea Boliviana". International Air Power Review. Volume 1, Summer 2001. pp. 28–31. .

 Hiltermann, Gijs. Lockheed T-33 (Vliegend in Nederland 3) (in Dutch). Eindhoven, Netherlands: Flash Aviation, 1988. .
 Hoyle, Craig. "World Air Forces 2015". Flight International, 8–14 December 2015, Vol. 188, No. 5517. pp. 26–53. .
 Pace, Steve. Lockheed Skunk Works. St. Paul, Minnesota: Motorbooks International, 1992. .
 Pocock, Chris. "Singapore Sting". Air International, Vol. 31, No. 2. pp. 59–64, 90–92.
 Siegrist, Martin. "Bolivian Air Power — Seventy Years On". Air International, Vol. 33, No. 4, October 1987. pp. 170–176, 194. .

External links

 T-33 in Mexican Air Force
 AeroWeb: T-33s on display list
 Warbird Alley: T-33 page
 Walkaround T-33 Shooting Star (Eskishehir, Turkey)
 Pictures of the T-33 at Oak Meadow Park, (Los Gatos, CA)
 Brief T-33 History on Air Mobility Command Museum Site with photo of display T-33 at Dover AFB, DE

T-33
1940s United States military trainer aircraft
Single-engined jet aircraft
Low-wing aircraft
Aircraft first flown in 1948